Briaglia is a comune (municipality) in the Province of Cuneo in the Italian region Piedmont, located about  south of Turin and about  east of Cuneo.

Briaglia borders the following municipalities: Mondovì, Niella Tanaro, and Vicoforte.

Demographic evolution

References 

Cities and towns in Piedmont